Rybalchino is a rural locality (a khutor) in Volchanskoye Rural Settlement, Kamensky District, Voronezh Oblast, Russia. The population was 116 as of 2010.

Geography 
Rybalchino is located 25 km north of Kamenka (the district's administrative centre) by road. Yevdakovo is the nearest rural locality.

References 

Rural localities in Kamensky District, Voronezh Oblast